Epicaridea is a former suborder of isopods, now treated as an infraorder in suborder Cymothoida. They are ectoparasites that inhabit other crustaceans, namely ostracods, copepods, barnacles and malacostracans. Epicarideans are found globally. Epicaridea are generally less well researched than other isopods.

There is a high degree of sexual dimorphism within epicarideans. The female is commonly very asymmetrical, often losing segmentation. Two pairs of rudimentary antennae are carried on the head. Mouthparts show little development, with only mandibles and maxillipeds present, sometimes with a second pair of rudimentary maxillae. Males are of smaller size than females and of different appearance. Development is through regressive metamorphosis, undergoing two or three larval stages.

The oldest trace fossils of epicarideans, comprising preserved damage to gills of fossilised crustaceans, goes back to the Late Jurassic, and a lost specimen from the Toarcian of Western New Guinea suggests that it may go back further to the Early Jurassic. Fossil epicaridean larvae are known from the Vendée amber of France and the Burmese amber of Myanmar, dating to the early Late Cretaceous, and also from Miocene aged Chiapas amber.

Classification
Eleven families are currently recognised within the suborder Epicaridea, divided into two superfamilies.
Superfamily Bopyroidea Rafinesque, 1815
Bopyridae Rafinesque, 1815
Colypuridae Richardson, 1905
Entoniscidae Kossmann, 1881
Ionidae H. Milne Edwards, 1840

Superfamily Cryptoniscoidea Kossmann, 1880
Asconiscidae Bonnier, 1900
Cabiropidae Giard & Bonnier, 1887
Crinoniscidae Bonnier, 1900
Cryptoniscidae Kossmann, 1880
Cyproniscidae Giard & Bonnier, 1887
Dajidae Giard & Bonnier, 1887
Entoniscidae Kossmann, 1881
Hemioniscidae Bonnier, 1900
Podasconidae Giard & Bonnier, 1895
Stellatoniscidae Oanh & Boyko, 2020

References

External links

Isopoda